The Revenge is the English title for Zemsta, a film released in 2002, directed by Andrzej Wajda. This film is an adaptation of a perennially popular stage farce of the same name by the Polish dramatist and poet Aleksander Fredro.

Raptusiewicz (Janusz Gajos) resides in one half of a castle with the other half inhabited by his hated rival Regent Milczek (Andrzej Seweryn). Raptusiewicz wishes to marry Podstolina (Katarzyna Figura), the widow of the Lord High Steward, for her money, while Podstolina herself seeks a wealthy match. Regent Milczek's wish, on the other hand, is to bring about the union of his son Wacław (Rafał Królikowski) with Podstolina. To complicate matters more, Wacław is in love with Klara (Agata Buzek) - ward and niece of Raptusiewicz, who took her in following the death of her parents - and the feeling is mutual. The plot thickens when Klara turns into Papkin's (Roman Polanski) declared object of love.

Written in a sharp, ironic style, The Revenge portrays those national characteristics that in time brought on many of Poland's national tragedies. Written for the stage, Wajda has changed very little and transferred practically the entirety of the work to the screen.

Cast
 Roman Polanski as Josef Papkin
 Janusz Gajos as Cześnik Raptusiewicz
 Andrzej Seweryn as Rejent Milczek
 Katarzyna Figura as Hanna, the Podstolina
 Daniel Olbrychski as Dyndalski
 Agata Buzek as Klara
 Rafał Królikowski as Wacław
 Lech Dyblik as Śmigalski
 Jerzy Slonka as Priest
 Magdalena Smalara as Rózia

See also 
Cinema of Poland
List of Polish language films

External links

2002 films
Polish films based on plays
Films directed by Andrzej Wajda
Films scored by Wojciech Kilar
2000s Polish-language films
2002 comedy films
Polish comedy films